Lee Andrew Hendrie (born 18 May 1977) is an English former professional footballer and pundit for Sky Sports.

As a player, he was a midfielder who notably played in the Premier League for Aston Villa where he spent fourteen years. He also played for the England U21s and earned one full cap for England in 1998. He has also played in Football League for Stoke City, Sheffield United, Leicester City, Derby County, Brighton & Hove Albion and Bradford City.

Following a spell in Indonesia with Bandung he became a journeyman in non-league football, playing for Daventry Town, Kidderminster Harriers, Chasetown, Redditch United, Tamworth, Corby Town, Highgate United and Basford United.

Playing career

Aston Villa
Born in Solihull, Hendrie was red carded on his debut for Aston Villa as a substitute in a 1–0 defeat at Queens Park Rangers on 23 December 1995. He went on to achieve the accolade of the club's "Young Player of the Season" award in the 1997–98 season. Whilst at Aston Villa he played in the 2000 FA Cup Final.

After losing his place in the Villa team during the 2005–06 season it seemed Hendrie's long spell at Villa Park was coming to an end, with Portsmouth reportedly showing an interest in his services. On 29 September he joined Stoke City on loan, on the recommendation of his father. On 30 January 2007, he extended his loan spell with the Potters until the end of the 2006–07 season. He played 28 times for Stoke scoring three goals which came against Leeds United, Sunderland and Norwich City.

During Hendrie's time with Villa, he crashed his Porsche as he tried to make a plane for a European game and his manager Graham Taylor had to deal with other disciplinary matters.

Sheffield United
Hendrie signed a three-year contract with Sheffield United after arriving on a free transfer in July 2007, making his debut on the opening day of the season, a 2–2 home draw with Colchester United. However, he was dogged by injuries for the first half of the season. Hendrie scored his first goal for the Blades in a 5–0 win over Morecambe in the League Cup in September 2007, but was unable to hold down a regular first-team place as the club struggled in the bottom half of the table. He scored his first league goal for Sheffield United in a 2–1 win over Queens Park Rangers on 12 January 2008.

With the departure of Bryan Robson in February 2008, new manager Kevin Blackwell quickly allowed Hendrie to join Leicester City in an emergency loan deal, with a view to a permanent move. He scored the winning goal for Leicester in a 1–0 win over Scunthorpe United on 29 March 2008 but could not prevent the club's relegation to League One and he subsequently returned to Bramall Lane.

In November 2008 he joined Blackpool on loan initially until 1 January 2009, making his debut as a second-half substitute the same day in the West Lancashire derby at home to Preston North End at Bloomfield Road. He was sent off for Blackpool versus Reading on 9 December 2008 and returned to Sheffield United on 31 December 2008 having made six appearances.

Having returned to Bramall Lane once more he vowed to try to force his way into first team contention having been given a wake up call by his time at Blackpool. He made a number of further substitute appearances for The Blades up to the end of the season. Having been brought off the bench in the 85th minute of the play off final against Burnley at Wembley he was subsequently sent off after the final whistle had blown for directing foul language at referee Mike Dean. Following the Blades unsuccessful play off campaign Hendrie was placed on the transfer list as the club sought to cut its wage bill.

Derby County
On 1 September 2009, Hendrie joined Derby County in a swap deal that involved Jordan Stewart moving in the opposite direction. Partly due to injury, Hendrie made just five starts for Derby before he moved to Brighton & Hove Albion on loan for the rest of the season on 23 March 2010. It was announced on 13 May 2010, that he would leave Derby at the end of his contract after just 10 appearances from his nine months with the club.

Bradford City
Hendrie was set to join Scottish-side Aberdeen but the deal fell through at the last minute. Instead, he started training with Championship side Reading, but was not offered a contract and was instead offered a short-term deal at his cousin John Hendrie's former club Bradford City by manager Peter Taylor. Taylor had previously managed Hendrie for England under-21s. Talking about his signing and the short-term deal, Hendrie said: "These next few weeks will be very interesting for me, and I will knuckle down. I have to use this to build up my fitness and get back to my peak." 
On 1 January 2011 it was confirmed by Bradford manager Peter Taylor that Hendrie's deal would not be extended due to finances and that the player had in fact, left the club. Taylor said "I feel really sorry for him. He has been a superb professional during his time at the football club. Lee's a great lad, he's still a great player. We have a League Two budget and we could only take this deal so far". Hendrie had played 14 times for The Bantams and had scored twice.

Hendrie was offered a deal by Conference National side Mansfield Town but turned it down because of a better offer from Bandung, a club from Indonesian breakaway league, Liga Primer Indonesia.

Bandung
On 26 January 2011, Indonesian club Bandung announced the signing of Hendrie on a free transfer. Hendrie signed a two-year contract with the Indonesian outfit and was assigned the number 10 jersey. He was both the first Englishman and the first player with Premier League experience to sign for a Liga Primer Indonesia club. He made his debut on 5 February 2011 in a 1–0 defeat against Persema Malang. He scored his first goal for Bandung and provided an assist for Perry Somah on 12 February 2011 in a 3–2 defeat against Batavia Union. On 12 March 2011, he provided another assist for Somah in a 1–0 win against Minangkabau. It was Bandung's first win in the 2011 Liga Primer Indonesia. At the end of season Hendrie was released from the club which then folded.

Non-league football
Throughout the summer of 2011, Hendrie joined a number of clubs for training and on trial. He was linked with a move to Wrexham but any hopes of that materialising broke down with manager Dean Saunders' departure to Doncaster Rovers. In July he joined Corby Town on a month's trial, however after just three weeks he left on his own accord. In late August, Hendrie agreed to train with Hinckley United, staying with the club for a month and playing in one friendly match at the start of October. Later that month, he signed for Daventry Town until the end of the season. Hendrie was signed by Daventry Town manager Mark Kinsella who was one of his former teammates at Aston Villa.

He made his debut for the club on 15 October 2011 in an FA Cup Third Qualifying Round match against Nuneaton Town. He played his first league game in a 2–0 loss against Uxbridge three days later. Hendrie's first win as a Daventry Town player came on 22 October as Kidsgrove Athletic were beaten 4–3 in the First Qualifying Round of the FA Trophy. Hendrie's younger brother, Stuart, joined him at Daventry on 21 October 2011, signing on a short-team loan deal from Hinckley United.

On 9 November 2011 Hendrie was unveiled by Kidderminster Harriers as having signed on non-contract terms. Allocated the number 34 shirt, he made his league debut on 26 November 2011 as a 60th-minute substitute in a 0–0 home draw with Cambridge United; he would go on to play in a further 14 league matches for Kidderminster before his release in March 2012. Immediately upon his release by Kidderminster, Hendrie signed for Northern Premier League Premier Division side Chasetown, returning to the lower levels of English non-league football after a 5-month absence. His Chasetown debut came in a 1–1 home draw with Matlock Town on 20 March 2012.

On 29 March 2012, Hendrie joined Southern League Premier club Redditch United, the club his father managed from 1991 to 1995, on a non-contract basis until the end of the season. Hendrie joined his brother Stuart at Redditch, the latter once again on loan from parent club Hinckley United.

Hendrie signed for Tamworth in the summer of 2012, taking the number 8 shirt; he made his debut for the club on 6 October 2012 as a 60th-minute substitute for George Baldock in a 2–1 home defeat to Newport County. He announced his retirement from the game in May 2013 to focus on his work as a director at FootieBugs, a football activity programme company for young children. He resumed his playing career in September 2013, joining Corby Town.

Hendrie soon moved on from Corby and on 3 December 2013, he played for Highgate United in their away Midland Football Alliance fixture against A.F.C. Wulfrunians. Hendrie scored and provided an assist on his début for the club in a 3–1 win. However, the club were quick to announce that Hendrie's appearance was only a "one-off" and that he had in fact signed for Nottinghamshire-based Basford United on 5 December. He remained dual-registered for Highgate, allowing him to potentially play for the club again (subject to his availability). He made a second appearance for the club two weeks later, on a night when Basford United did not have a fixture.

Hendrie scored on his début for Basford against Armthorpe Welfare. In April 2014 Hendrie stated he was a victim of forgery and that someone had falsified transfer documents claiming he was moving to Tavistock.

Hendrie left Basford United in October 2015. He subsequently played for Montpellier (based in Badsey), before returning to Redditch United. He then signed for Nuneaton Griff, before returning to Highgate United.

International career
Despite his Scottish and Irish parentage, Hendrie represented England, the country of his birth, at international level. He appeared twelve times for the England under-21 team, scoring five goals.

He won his only full international cap for England at the age of 21 as a late substitute on 18 November 1998 against the Czech Republic.

Personal life
Lee Hendrie is the son of Scottish former professional footballer Paul Hendrie. Paul Hendrie moved to England in March 1972 to join Birmingham City. Hendrie was born in Birmingham on 18 May 1977. His younger brother, Stuart Hendrie, is also a footballer, who played alongside him at Daventry Town. Hendrie is the cousin of another Scottish professional footballer, John Hendrie.

On 27 January 2012, Hendrie was declared bankrupt by Her Majesty's Revenue and Customs at the High Court. During this time, Hendrie twice tried to take his own life.

Aside from his playing career Hendrie is also a director of FootieBugs, a sister company of YogaBugs, which provides football-based activities and events for children aged 2 to 7.

Hendrie now works as a pundit for Sky Sports.

Career statistics

Club

International
Source:

Honours
Aston Villa
UEFA Intertoto Cup: 2001
FA Cup runner-up: 1999–2000

Individual
Aston Villa Young Player of the Season: 1997–98

References

External links

 
 BBC Sport profile 

1977 births
Living people
Footballers from Birmingham, West Midlands
English footballers
England under-21 international footballers
England B international footballers
England international footballers
English people of Scottish descent
Premier League players
English Football League players
Southern Football League players
National League (English football) players
Northern Premier League players
Association football midfielders
Aston Villa F.C. players
Stoke City F.C. players
Sheffield United F.C. players
Leicester City F.C. players
Blackpool F.C. players
Derby County F.C. players
Brighton & Hove Albion F.C. players
Bradford City A.F.C. players
Daventry Town F.C. players
Kidderminster Harriers F.C. players
Chasetown F.C. players
Redditch United F.C. players
Tamworth F.C. players
Expatriate footballers in Indonesia
Corby Town F.C. players
Midland Football Alliance players
Highgate United F.C. players
Basford United F.C. players
Nuneaton Griff F.C. players
FA Cup Final players